This is a list of seasons completed by the Belfast Giants ice hockey team presently of the British Elite League. This list documents the season-by-season records of the Belfast Giants from their foundation as members of the Ice Hockey Superleague in 2000 to the present day.

The Giants have won two league titles, in 2001–02 and 2005–06 and one Playoff Championship, in 2002–03.

Footnotes

References
giants-history.com
panthershistory.co.uk
BBC News Online

Belfast-related lists
Seasons